Triebischtal is a former municipality in the district of Meißen, in Saxony, Germany. Since 1 July 2012, it is part of the municipality Klipphausen.

References 

Former municipalities in Saxony
Meissen (district)